Ledol is a poisonous sesquiterpene that can cause cramps, paralysis, and delirium. Caucasian peasants used Rhododendron plants for these effects in shamanistic rituals.

Sources
Ledol is found in labrador tea, an herbal tea (not a true tea) made from three closely related species: 
 Rhododendron tomentosum – Northern Labrador tea, previously Ledum palustre
 Rhododendron groenlandicum – Bog Labrador tea, previously Ledum groenlandicum or Ledum latifolium 
 Rhododendron columbianum – Western Labrador tea, or trapper's tea, previously Ledum glandulosum

Ledol is also found in the essential oil of priprioca at a concentration of around 4%.

Ledol is also found to varying concentrations in the following plants:

References

Entheogens
Deliriants
Plant toxins
Sesquiterpenes
Cyclopropanes